Nigel David McKail Ritchie-Calder (2 December 1931 – 25 June 2014) was a British science writer and climate change denier.

Early life
Nigel Calder was born on 2 December 1931. His father was Ritchie Calder. His mother was Mabel Jane Forbes McKail. He had four siblings, including historian Angus Calder (1942–2008), mathematician Allan Calder and educationist Isla Calder (1946–2000). He was educated at Merchant Taylors' School, Northwood and Sidney Sussex College, Cambridge.

Career
Between 1956 and 1966, Calder wrote for the magazine New Scientist, serving as editor from 1962 until 1966. After that, he worked as an independent author and TV screenwriter. He conceived and scripted thirteen major documentaries and series concerning popular science subjects broadcast by the BBC and Channel 4 (London), with accompanying books. For his television work he received the Kalinga Prize for the Popularization of Science during 1972. During 2004, his book Magic Universe was shortlisted for The Aventis Prizes for Science Books.

Calder said that climate change science has been invaded by sophistry about man-made global warming. As early as 1980, he predicted that by 2030 "the much-advertised heating of the earth by the man-made carbon-dioxide 'greenhouse' [will fail] to occur; instead, there [will be] renewed concern about cooling and an impending ice age".<ref>The Book of Predictions, 28 years later, Vanity Fair, 16 June 2008.</ref>

Calder participated in making the film The Great Global Warming Swindle. He also co-authored The Chilling Stars. Regarding global warming, Calder stated: "Governments are trying to achieve unanimity by stifling any scientist who disagrees.  Einstein could not have got funding under the present system."

Personal life
His wife (Elisabeth Palmer) was formerly an adviser on language teaching for the London Chamber of Commerce. They had two sons, including travel writer Simon Calder, and three daughters.

Death
Calder died in Crawley, West Sussex, England on 25 June 2014, aged 82.

Works
1957  Electricity Grows Up—author, for Phoenix
1957  Robots—author, for Phoenix
1958  Radio Astronomy—author, for Phoenix
1965  The World in 1984—editor, for Penguin etc.
1967  The Environment Game—author, for Secker, Holt, etc.
1968  Unless Peace Comes—editor, for Allen Lane, Viking etc.
1969  The Violent Universe—author, for BBC, Viking, etc.
1969  Technopolis—author, for McGibbon & Kee, Shuster, etc.
1970  The Mind of Man—author, for BBC, Viking, etc.
1970  Living Tomorrow—author, for Penguin Education
1972  The Restless Earth—author, for BBC, Viking, etc.
1973  Nature in the Round—editor, for Weidenfeld
1973  The Life Game—author, for BBC, Viking, etc.
1974  The Weather Machine—author, for BBC, Viking, etc.
1976  The Human Conspiracy—author, for BBC, Viking, etc.
1977  The Key to the Universe—author, for BBC, Viking, etc.
1978  Spaceships of the Mind—author, for BBC, Viking, etc.
1979  Einstein's Universe—author, for BBC, Viking, etc. – reissued 2005
1979  Nuclear Nightmares—author, for BBC, Viking, etc.
1980  The Comet is Coming!—author, for BBC, Viking, etc. – reissued 1994
1983  Timescale: Atlas of the Fourth Dimension—author, for Viking etc.
1983  1984 and Beyond—author, for Century and Viking
1986  The English Channel—author, for Viking and Chatto
1986  The Green Machines—author, for Putnam, etc.
1988  Future Earth—a contributing editor, for Croom-Helm, etc.
1990  Scientific Europe—general editor, for Foundation Scientific Europe
1991  Spaceship Earth—author, for Viking UK etc.
1992  Giotto mission to the Comets—author, for Presswork and Springer
1993  Hubble Space Telescope: The Harvest So Far—author, for European Space Agency
1994  Comets: Speculations and Science—reissue by Dover of The Comet is Coming!
1995  Beyond This World—author, for European Space Agency
1997  The Manic Sun—author, for Pilkington Press etc.
1999  Success Story: 30 Discoveries—compiler, for European Space Agency
2003  Magic Universe: The Oxford Guide to Modern Science—author, for Oxford UP, etc.
2005  Einstein’s Universe (updated for Einstein Year) – author, for Penguin UK & US, etc.
2005  Albert Einstein: Relativity – introduction to a Penguin Classic, Penguin US
2007  The Chilling Stars'' – joint author with Henrik Svensmark for Icon Books, etc.

References

External links

Nigel Calder Interview With LondonBookReview.com

English male journalists
English science writers
People educated at Merchant Taylors' School, Northwood
Alumni of Sidney Sussex College, Cambridge
Kalinga Prize recipients
1931 births
2014 deaths
Nigel
English people of Scottish descent
Place of birth missing
Sons of life peers
New Scientist people